RAISE can refer to :
 Rigorous Approach to Industrial Software Engineering
 Rapid Acquisition Imaging Spectrograph Experiment, a NASA Heliophysics project
 Redundant Array of Independent Silicon Elements, a data integrity feature in SandForce-based SSDs

See also
 Raise (disambiguation)